Cymolutes lecluse, the sharp-headed wrasse or Hawaiian knifefish, is a species of marine ray-finned fish from the family Labridae, the wrasses. It is endemic to the Hawaiian Islands where it is found in lagoons over sandy substrates and is piscivorous.

References

Fish described in 1824
Cymolutes